Mārtiņš Zīverts (27 July 1903 in Mežmuiža, Vilce parish – 4 October 1990) was a Latvian playwright.

Biography 

Zīverts was born in Mežmuiža, Courland Governorate (now Vilce parish, Jelgava municipality, Latvia). He studied philosophy at the University of Latvia in Riga, later working as an editor and dramaturgist at the National Theater in Riga.
He came to Sweden as a refugee in 1944. While he often worked as a laborer, he continued to write and direct plays, and served as chairman of the Latvian PEN center. He wrote almost 40 plays in several genres.

Work

 Hasana harēms, 1927
 Kropļi, 1933
 Zelta zeme, 1933
 Galvu augšā!, 1937
 Tīreļpurvs, 1937
 Ķīnas vāze, 1940
 Vara, 1944
 Kāds, kura nav, 1947
 Čūska, 1960.
 Meli meklē meli, 1962
 Kaļostro Vilcē, 1967
 Nauda, 1967
 Totēms, 1972
 Par sevi: autobiogrāfija, intervijas, vēstules, 1992

Adaptations
In 1992 a Lithuanian director Juozas Sabolius has made a two-part costume drama based on Zīverts' play "Vara" (Power) about the life of Lithuania's king Mindaugas which was aired by Lithuania's national broadcaster.

Footnotes

1903 births
1990 deaths
People from Jelgava Municipality
People from Courland Governorate
Latvian writers
University of Latvia alumni